Cléber Schwenck Tiene (born February 8, 1979), or simply Schwenck, is a Brazilian football player who plays as a striker for CE União Beltrão.

Career
He joined Pohang Steelers after a very brief spell with Beitar Jerusalem in 2007. In 2008, he start with Goiás Esporte Clube in Brazil.

Club statistics

Honours
Federal District League: 2002
Minas Gerais State League: 2004
Santa Catarina State League: 2006
K-League: 2007
Bahia State League: 2010
Brazilian Série B: 2014
Campeonato Carioca Série B: 2016

References

External links
 Profile and statistics of Cléber Schwenck Tiene on One.co.il 
 
 
 footcoreen
 
 

1979 births
Living people
Brazilian footballers
Brazilian expatriate footballers
Expatriate footballers in Israel
Expatriate footballers in Japan
Campeonato Brasileiro Série A players
Campeonato Brasileiro Série B players
Israeli Premier League players
J2 League players
Clube Atlético Juventus players
Clube de Regatas Brasil players
America Football Club (RJ) players
Clube Atlético Bragantino players
Cruzeiro Esporte Clube players
Botafogo de Futebol e Regatas players
Goiás Esporte Clube players
Esporte Clube Juventude players
Criciúma Esporte Clube players
Vegalta Sendai players
Figueirense FC players
Expatriate footballers in South Korea
Beitar Jerusalem F.C. players
Pohang Steelers players
Esporte Clube Vitória players
Itumbiara Esporte Clube players
Guarani FC players
ABC Futebol Clube players
Clube Náutico Marcílio Dias players
Joinville Esporte Clube players
Esporte Clube Internacional de Lages players
Brazilian people of German descent
Brazilian expatriate sportspeople in South Korea
People from Nova Iguaçu
Association football forwards
Sportspeople from Rio de Janeiro (state)